Angela Kay Everhart (born September 7, 1969) is an American actress and former model who appeared in several Sports Illustrated Swimsuit Issues in the 1990s and posed nude for Playboy in 2000.

Early life
Everhart was born on September 7, 1969, in Akron, Ohio, the daughter of homemaker Ginnie and engineer Bob Everhart.

Career

As a teen, Everhart became a cover model for such fashion magazines as Elle and Glamour. Following a horseback riding accident in which she broke her back at the age of 19, Everhart eventually recovered through physical therapy. She appeared in several issues of the annual Sports Illustrated swimsuit edition, starting in 1995. Everhart posed nude for a cover-featured pictorial in the February 2000 issue of Playboy. She was ranked #98 on the FHM 100 Sexiest Women of 2003.

Everhart made her film debut in 1993 with the Arnold Schwarzenegger action-comedy Last Action Hero. She has since appeared in such films as Tales From the Crypt Presents: Bordello of Blood (1996), Denial (1998), Mad Dog Time (1996), Gunblast Vodka (2000), Jade (1995), Executive Target (1997), Another 9½ Weeks (1997), The Substitute: Failure Is Not an Option (2001), Sexual Predator (2001), Bare Witness (2001), Wicked Minds (2003), Payback (2006), Bigfoot (2008), and Take Me Home Tonight (2011).

She has also appeared on a few TV and reality shows. In 2000, she played a lawyer in Law and Order: Special Victims Unit. In 2004, she appeared in Celebrity Mole: Yucatan, in which she was the "mole", the rogue agent sabotaging the group. She was one of the "Gingers" on the second season of The Real Gilligan's Island (the other was Erika Eleniak), but left the show when she accidentally cut her finger severely enough to sever tendons and require surgery. Everhart was also a panelist on To Tell The Truth from 2000 until 2001 and on Hollywood Squares from 2002 until 2004. Everhart was a co-host on the ABC reality show The Ex-Wives Club, along with Marla Maples, and Shar Jackson in 2007.

Everhart's long red hair earned her three Crown Awards for "Best Redhead" at the Super-Hair.Net website from 2005 to 2007. She also represented the United States in two Super-Hair World Cup tournaments, winning the championship through online votes in both 2006 and 2010.

On February 28, 2012, Everhart began co-hosting the weekly live podcast Hot N Heavy with The Greg Wilson on the Toad Hop Network. It is recorded at Jon Lovitz Comedy Club & Podcast Theatre.

Personal life

Everhart was married to Ashley Hamilton from December 1, 1996, until their divorce in March 1997.  Sylvester Stallone and Everhart were briefly engaged in 1995, but they never married. She was  engaged to  Joe Pesci, but the couple broke up in 2008.

She gave birth to her first child, son Kayden Bobby Everhart, in 2009, with boyfriend Chad Stansbury.

She was diagnosed with thyroid cancer and had surgery on May 14, 2013. A representative of hers said, "[Angie] wants to set the record straight by letting everyone know that it is true that she has been diagnosed with thyroid cancer, however, the prognosis is very good." She filed for bankruptcy due to medical expenses from thyroid cancer treatment.

In October 2017, Everhart accused Harvey Weinstein of masturbating in front of her.

Once a skydiving enthusiast, she gave up the activity following an accident in which she was injured badly enough to require back surgery.

She is fluent in French.

References

External links

1969 births
Female models from Ohio
American film actresses
American television actresses
Legends Football League players
Living people
Participants in American reality television series
Actresses from Akron, Ohio
21st-century American women